Shillong Commerce College, established in 1986, is a general degree college situated in Shillong, Meghalaya, India. 

This college is affiliated with the North Eastern Hill University.

References

External links
http://scccollege.ac.in

Universities and colleges in Meghalaya
Colleges affiliated to North-Eastern Hill University
Educational institutions established in 1986
1986 establishments in Meghalaya